The Sapphire is a pair of apartment buildings in Southfield, Michigan.

The Sapphire Tower I 
The Sapphire Tower I Is located at 16500 North Park Drive. It was constructed in 1967 by Sullivan & Smith Inc and stands at 19 floors in height. The high-rise was designed in the modern architectural style and has approximately 313 apartment units ranging from 1,000 square feet to 3,800 square feet.

The Sapphire Tower II 
The Sapphire Tower II is located at 16500 North Park Drive in Southfield, Michigan. Like Tower I, Tower II was completed in 1967 and also stands at 19 floors in height. It is basically the twin of the other apartment building, designed the same way.

External links 
 Google Maps location of North Park Towers I and II
 
 
 
 

Skyscrapers in Southfield, Michigan
Apartment buildings in Michigan
Buildings and structures completed in 1967
Twin towers
Residential skyscrapers in Michigan